"Fly Too High" is a song by Janis Ian.  It is a track from her 1979 LP, Night Rains.

The song became a modest hit in the UK (#44), a major hit in Australia (#7) and The Netherlands (#5), and a number-one hit in South Africa.

"Fly Too High" was written and recorded for the film Foxes, and it is included on the soundtrack.

Chart history

Weekly charts

Year-end charts

References

External links
 

1979 songs
1979 singles
Janis Ian songs
Songs written by Janis Ian
Columbia Records singles
Number-one singles in South Africa
Songs written for films
Songs written by Giorgio Moroder
Song recordings produced by Harold Faltermeyer